People who served as the mayor of the Municipality of The Glebe are:

References

Mayors Glebe
Glebe, Mayors
Mayors of Glebe